The 2012 New Brunswick Scotties Tournament of Hearts, New Brunswick's women's provincial curling championship, was held from January 25 to 29 at the Gage Golf & Curling Club in Oromocto, New Brunswick. The winning team of Rebecca Atkinson, represented New Brunswick at the 2012 Scotties Tournament of Hearts in Red Deer, Alberta, finishing with a 5-6 record.

Teams

Standings

Results

Draw 1
January 25, 2:00 PM

Draw 2
January 25, 7:00 PM

Draw 3
January 26,  2:00 PM

Draw 4
January 26, 7:00 PM

Draw 5
January 27, 9:30 AM

Draw 6
January 27,  1:00 PM

Draw 7
January 28, 8:30 AM

Playoffs

Semifinal
January 28, 6:30 PM

Final
January 29, 2:30 PM

References

New Brunswick
New Brunswick Scotties Tournament of Hearts